HealthCare Volunteer is a non-profit organization that connects volunteers with a health-related volunteering opportunity. The organization provides medical, dental, and surgical services to needy patients and impoverished people worldwide, through indirect and direct patient-care programs.

The company also provides a social networking application that allows health volunteers to connect with each other and create new volunteer teams. The organization has matched over 290,000 volunteers to nearly 3,300 organizations worldwide. In total, over 1.5 million patients have received health care as a result of its indirect and direct patient care programs.

History
In 2005, during his first year at UCLA Dental School, Patel decided to travel to Brazil to provide dental services to underserved communities. But, he encountered difficulties in finding volunteer opportunities, having contacted more than 15 Brazilian organizations and receiving no response. He found that other dental and medical students had experienced similar problems. To address this problem, Patel created the Dental Volunteer and later HealthCare Volunteer to help connect students with volunteer opportunities.

During Dental school, Neilesh Patel said he spent many "pizza nights" – subsisting on pizza and pulling all-nighters teaching himself how to program and build a Web site, which became the backbone of HealthCare Volunteer. He said he was driven by the belief that all qualified applicants should have the opportunity to volunteer. Soon, now-orthopedic surgeon Elliot Mendelosohn, also a biomedical engineering major in his undergraduate days, joined Patel to help build HealthCare Volunteer.

Founded by Neilesh Patel DDS and Elliot Mendelsohn MD in November 2005, HealthCare Volunteer has a large listing of health-related volunteering opportunities serving the non-profit sector. Volunteers include physicians, dentists, medical students, and dental assistants, who donate their time to provide services including free surgery and dental care. The organization has direct patient care programs in over 10 countries including India, Ecuador, Kenya, Tanzania, Liberia, Cameroon, and Paraguay.

In 2007,  Patel was selected as a YouthActionNet Fellow in recognition of the organization's efforts, which was awarded at the Embassy of Finland in Washington DC.  In 2008, Patel was awarded the UCLA Charles E Young Humanitarian Award for his work in global health. Patel reportedly dropped out of the UCLA MBA Program in 2007 after starting classes his first quarter as the first ever student in the integrated DDS/MBA program in order to focus on HV's growth.

Patel and Mendelsohn have also established HealthCare Tourism International, the first non profit medical tourism accreditation service. Patel started his first non-profit StudentsHelp.org (www.studentshelp.org) at age 17, which helped provide computer services and technical support to needy people around the world.

In 2013, Patel received the Samuel S. Beard Award for Greatest Public Service by an Individual 35 Years or Under, an award given out annually by Jefferson Awards.

Volunteer networking
One of the unique features of the HealthCare Volunteer website is its ability to allow volunteers to create online profiles and connect with other volunteers. Once volunteers have signed up and created their profiles, they can form volunteering teams for service at home or abroad.

Exercising a 'free volunteering' philosophy
HealthCare Volunteer has sought to reduce the financial burdens for both volunteers and organizations. First, volunteers pay no money to search HealthCare Volunteer for volunteering opportunities nor must organizations pay any money to post their volunteering opportunities on HealthCare Volunteer. Secondly, HealthCare Volunteer strives to exclusively partner with organizations that do not charge their volunteers additional money beyond accommodation and other essential services in order to volunteer. HealthCare Volunteer believes that volunteers are already volunteering their time and effort, and should not be required to pay additional fees above the basic costs (travel, accommodation, and basic services).

Organizational awards
In 2007, HealthCare Volunteer began awarding volunteers who helped advance the mission of HealthCare Volunteer.

2007 Awards:

2008 Awards:

See also
 List of awards for volunteerism and community service

References

External links
 HealthCare Volunteer website
 Dental Volunteer website
 New York Times mention
 Shreveport Times mention
 Brainstorming Interview with Company's Founder
 Company's Founder mentioned in the Financial Times
 Company's Founder, Neilesh Patel, awarded Humanitarian Award
 Company's Founder mentioned by UCLA Newsroom
 HealthCare Volunteer acquires HealthCare Tourism International

Non-profit organizations based in Los Angeles
International medical and health organizations
Charities based in California
Health charities in the United States
Medical and health organizations based in California
Medical volunteerism